Charles Edward Cahill (January 4, 1904 – June 5, 1954) was a Canadian ice hockey right winger.

Early life 
Cahill was born in Summerside, Prince Edward Island. He played junior hockey with the Summerside Crystals.

Career 
Cahill played parts of two seasons in the National Hockey League with the Boston Bruins from 1925 to 1927. The rest of his career, which lasted from 1921 to 1939 (with a break from 1931 to 1935), was mainly spent in minor leagues and senior leagues.

Career statistics

Regular season and playoffs

External links

References 

1904 births
1954 deaths
Boston Bruins players
Buffalo Bisons (IHL) players
Canadian ice hockey right wingers
Ice hockey people from Prince Edward Island
New Haven Eagles players
Philadelphia Arrows players
People from Summerside, Prince Edward Island
Canadian expatriate ice hockey players in the United States